Joey Brinson is an American wheelchair fencer.

Biography
Brinson was born in 1976 in Jackson, Mississippi. He became paralyzed after a car accident at the age of 17. He was got interested in a sport in 2006 when a Methodist Rehabilitation Center in his home city added fencing as a part of their sports program for disabled individuals. In 2007, he was one of the founders of Blade Rollers, a fencing team supported by MRC. He won bronze medals in both épée and sabre at U.S. Fencing National Wheelchair Championship in 2011 and the same year won another bronze for épée and a silver one for foil at Parapan American Games. In 2012 he won a bronze medal in sabre at the North American Cup, and the same year got a gold one for the same thing, and a silver one for épée at the 2012 U.S. Fencing National Wheelchair Championship.

References

Paralympic wheelchair fencers of the United States
1976 births
Living people
Sportspeople from Jackson, Mississippi
American male épée fencers
American male foil fencers
American male sabre fencers